The Capital City Club is a private social club located in Atlanta, Georgia. Chartered on May 21, 1883, it is one of the oldest private clubs in the South.

History
According to its charter, the purpose of the club is "to promote the pleasure, kind feeling and general culture of its members." Harry C. Stockdell was the club's first president.  He was succeeded in 1884 by Robert J. Lowry; and in 1885 Livingston Mims began the longest term as president, serving, with a two-year interruption, from 1886 through 1906.  Subsequent presidents have all served two years or less.

The first club house was located at 43 Walton Street. In August 1884, the club moved to a new establishment at 114 Peachtree Street. The Club presently operates three facilities for the use of its members, the oldest of which, the downtown Atlanta club building on John Portman Blvd., was dedicated on December 16, 1911. Herbert Barker was the original architect of the golf course, which was completed in 1911. The Capital City Country Club, located in Brookhaven, was leased in 1913 and purchased in 1915. At that time the golf course was increased from nine to eighteen holes. The present country club building was erected in 1928.

Notable individuals, including several presidents of the United States and royalty from other nations, have been guests at the Capital City Club.

Architecture
The downtown Atlanta Capital City Club was designed by Beaux-Arts-trained architect Donn Barber in "the dignified and rather severe mode that characterizes prestigious New York City clubs such as the Colony Club (McKim, Mead & White, 1906)." Georgian Revival in its textures and motifs, the building was originally four-stories with a fifth floor being added above the dentiled cornice later in its history.

Their Capital City Country Club (1928) designed by Burge and Stevens, survives in Historic Brookhaven and "presents a picturesque, rambling, manorial image." "Tall chimneys, the cylindrical stair tower with [its] conical roof", and "[its] obliquely projecting gabled wings" create an "irregular silhouette of French provincial forms".

Notable members
Notable members of Capital City Club include:
 Asa Griggs Candler, Founder of The Coca-Cola Company
 Robert W. Woodruff, President of The Coca-Cola Company from 1923 until 1954
 Edwin P. Ansley, Atlanta real estate developer in the early 20th century
 Charles A. Collier, president of the Cotton States and International Exposition (1895)
 Joel Hurt, founder of the Trust Company of Georgia
 Joseph E. Brown, Civil War Governor of Georgia
 Alexander C. King and Jack Spalding, co-founders of American law firm King & Spalding
 John C. Portman, Jr., American architect and real estate developer
 William B. Hartsfield, mayor of Atlanta
 Alfred W. Jones, developer of Sea Island, Georgia
 Robert A. Toombs, Secretary of State of the Confederate States of America
 Henry W. Grady, New South advocate and editor of the Atlanta Constitution
 Robert Tyre "Bobby" Jones Jr., only winner of the Grand Slam of golf, founder of Augusta National Golf Club and the Masters Tournament
 Oliver Clyde Fuller,  Fuller and Son, Wholesale Grocers during reconstruction Atlanta, GA. Later banker and president of First Wisconsin National Bank, which eventually became U.S. Bancorp.

See also
 List of American gentlemen's clubs
National Register of Historic Places listings in Fulton County, Georgia

References

External links

Official site
Brookhaven Historic District historical marker

1883 establishments in Georgia (U.S. state)
Clubhouses on the National Register of Historic Places in Georgia (U.S. state)
Clubs and societies in the United States
Organizations based in Atlanta
Gentlemen's clubs in the United States
Buildings and structures in Atlanta
Brookhaven, Georgia
National Register of Historic Places in Atlanta